Mohamed El-Azoul (born 7 January 1966) is an Egyptian former swimmer. He competed at the 1988 Summer Olympics and the 1992 Summer Olympics.

References

External links
 

1966 births
Living people
Egyptian male swimmers
Olympic swimmers of Egypt
Swimmers at the 1988 Summer Olympics
Swimmers at the 1992 Summer Olympics
Place of birth missing (living people)
20th-century Egyptian people
21st-century Egyptian people